Macrocneme cinyras is a moth of the subfamily Arctiinae. It was described by William Schaus in 1889. It is found in Mexico.

References

Macrocneme
Moths described in 1889